In order theory a better-quasi-ordering or bqo is a quasi-ordering that does not admit a certain type of bad array. Every better-quasi-ordering is a well-quasi-ordering.

Motivation 

Though well-quasi-ordering is an appealing notion, many important infinitary operations do not preserve well-quasi-orderedness. 
An example due to Richard Rado illustrates this. 
In a 1965 paper Crispin Nash-Williams formulated the stronger notion of better-quasi-ordering in order to prove that the class of trees of height ω is well-quasi-ordered under the topological minor relation. Since then, many quasi-orderings have been proven to be well-quasi-orderings by proving them to be better-quasi-orderings. For instance, Richard Laver established Laver's theorem (previously a conjecture of Roland Fraïssé) by proving that the class of scattered linear order types is better-quasi-ordered. More recently, Carlos Martinez-Ranero has proven that, under the proper forcing axiom, the class of Aronszajn lines is better-quasi-ordered under the embeddability relation.

Definition 

It is common in better-quasi-ordering theory to write  for the sequence  with the first term omitted. The relation  is not transitive.

A block  is an infinite subset of  that contains an initial segment of every
For a quasi-order , a -pattern is a function from some block  into . A -pattern  is said to be bad if  for every pair  such that ; otherwise  is good. A quasi-ordering  is called a better-quasi-ordering if there is no bad -pattern.

In order to make this definition easier to work with, Nash-Williams defines a barrier to be a block whose elements are pairwise incomparable under the inclusion relation . A -array is a -pattern whose domain is a barrier. By observing that every block contains a barrier, one sees that  is a better-quasi-ordering if and only if there is no bad -array.

Simpson's alternative definition 

Let  be a quasi-ordering and endow  with the discrete topology. A -array  is bad if  for every ;
 is good otherwise. The quasi-ordering  is a better-quasi-ordering if there is no bad -array in this sense.

Major theorems 

Many major results in better-quasi-ordering theory are consequences of the Minimal Bad Array Lemma, which appears in Simpson's paper as follows. See also Laver's paper, where the Minimal Bad Array Lemma was first stated as a result. The technique was present in Nash-Williams' original 1965 paper.

Suppose  is a quasi-order.
 
 
We say a bad -array  is minimal bad (with respect to the partial ranking ) if there is no bad -array  such that .
The relation  is not the strict part of the relation .

Theorem (Minimal Bad Array Lemma). Let  be a quasi-order equipped with a partial ranking and suppose  is a bad -array. Then there is a minimal bad -array  such that .

See also

 Well-quasi-ordering
 Well-order

References

Binary relations
Order theory
Wellfoundedness